Leslie Neil Little, Jr. (born December 18, 1971) is a Canadian former professional ice hockey goaltender. He was a member of the Philadelphia Flyers organization nearly his entire professional career, helping backstop the Philadelphia Phantoms to two Calder Cup championships and playing in two career National Hockey League (NHL) games with the Flyers. Until 2015, he was an amateur scout for the Flyers. He is now a scout for the NHL Florida Panthers.

Playing career
Little played 4 seasons for R.P.I. (NCAA Div 1, ECAC) before starting a professional career. 

Little has played for the Hershey Bears and Philadelphia Phantoms in the AHL, as well as playing two NHL games for the Philadelphia Flyers. He signed with the Espoo Blues in the Finnish SM-liiga for the 2005–06 season, played there until Christmas, then finished the season in Geneva, Switzerland.

On December 28, 2003, he was the "flying goalie" in a brawl between the Phantoms and the Binghamton Senators as several players from the two teams were fighting next to the Senators' net, Little skated across the rink and dove into the crowd.

Despite only playing two career games with the Philadelphia Flyers, Little was named as one of the Flyers goaltenders for the 2012 NHL Winter Classic Alumni game.

He is also the founder of ProHockeyLaunch.com which is an evaluation and mentorship company for up-and-coming young hockey players.

Coaching career
Following his playing career, Little was named an assistant coach/goaltending development coach for the Philadelphia Phantoms as well as a global scout for the Philadelphia Flyers, concentrating his focus on goaltenders. He spent eight seasons with the Flyers organization before spending six seasons working with the Florida Panthers.  Little spent the 2021-22 season working for the independent scouting firm Team 33 and was hired in the fall of 2022 by the Montreal Canadiens as a scout.

He was the assistant coach for the Princeton University Men's hockey team from 2007–08 to 2010–11 seasons.

Personal life
He married Catherine M Foote, DMD of Ardmore, PA in July 2013. Neil has four children, Nicholas, Elsie, Graysen and Piper.

Awards and honours

 1997–98: Calder Cup Philadelphia Phantoms
 2004–05: Calder Cup Philadelphia Phantoms
 2006: Inducted into Philadelphia Phantoms Hall of Fame
 2007: Inducted into RPI's Athletic Hall of Fame

Career statistics

Regular season

References

External links
 

1971 births
Canadian ice hockey goaltenders
Espoo Blues players
Estevan Bruins (SJHL) players
Florida Panthers scouts
Grand Rapids Griffins (IHL) players
Hershey Bears players
Ice hockey people from Alberta
Johnstown Chiefs players
Living people
Philadelphia Flyers draft picks
Philadelphia Flyers players
Philadelphia Flyers scouts
Philadelphia Phantoms players
Rensselaer Polytechnic Institute alumni
RPI Engineers men's ice hockey players
Sportspeople from Medicine Hat
Canadian expatriate ice hockey players in Finland
Canadian expatriate ice hockey players in the United States
AHCA Division I men's ice hockey All-Americans